Palladium(II,IV) fluoride, also known as palladium trifluoride, is a chemical compound of palladium and fluorine. It has the empirical formula PdF3, but is better described as the mixed-valence compound palladium(II) hexafluoropalladate(IV), PdII[PdIVF6], and is often written as Pd[PdF6] or Pd2F6.

Synthesis
Pd[PdF6] is the most stable product of the reaction of fluorine and metallic palladium.

2 Pd + 3 F2 → Pd[PdF6]

Structure and properties
Pd[PdF6] is paramagnetic, and both Pd(II) and Pd(IV) occupy octahedral sites in the crystal structure. The PdII-F distance is 2.17 Å, whereas the PdIV-F distance is 1.90 Å.

See also
 Palladium fluoride

References

Palladium compounds
Fluorides
Platinum group halides
Mixed valence compounds